Chief of Army Staff (CAS) of Bangladesh Army, also known as Army Chief, is the highest-ranking officer of the Bangladesh Army. The Chief of Army staff has been a four-star rank since 2007.  Maj. Gen. M. A. Rab (the then Lt Col) was the Chief of Staff Army under the combined command of Bangladesh Forces which served as the origins of Bangladesh Armed Forces. After the War of Independence Bangladesh Army was officially reverted to the Ministry of Defense in 1972 and Maj. Gen. K. M. Shafiullah was appointed the  Chief of Army Staff. The current Chief of Army Staff is Gen SM Shafiuddin Ahmed 

The office of the Chief of Army Staff functions from the Army Headquarters, which is located in the Dhaka Cantonment.

History 
The Bangladesh Army traced its roots back to the East Bengal Regiment composed solely of youths of East Bengal, then East Pakistan. However, on 25 March 1971, after long negotiations and actions failed to bring desired results  Pakistan Armed Forces led a military crackdown on its own citizens, certain sections of people in  East Pakistan (E. Bengal). There were civilian deaths and casualties also. Pakistan military planners conducted this through Operation Searchlight, which spread across the country in main centers. During the first watch of 26th March 1971, Sheikh Mujibur Rahman declared the Independence of Bangladesh. Another declaration was read out on 27 March 1971, by Major Ziaur Rahman, on behalf of Sheikh Mujibur Rahman over radio at Kalurghat Radio Stn., Chittagong city. As a result, in March 1971, many Bengali soldiers in the Pakistan Army revolted and joined the guerilla movement,  Bangladesh Forces. Colonel Mohd. Ataul Goni Osmani served as the Commander-in-Chief and Lieutenant colonel Mohd. Abdur Rab as the Chief of Staff.

Bangladesh Army came into being officially in January, 1972. In April, Prime Minister Sheikh Mujibur Rahman then decided to change the commanding posts of the three services which was combined and commanded by General M. A. G. Osmani. On 7 April, Maj. Gen. K M Shafiullah, was made the chief of army staff.

Chief of Army Staff's rank was upgraded to lieutenant-general in 1978 and then to four star general in 2007.

Appointees 
The following table chronicles the appointees to the office of the Chief of Army Staff or its preceding positions since the Bangladesh Liberation War. Ranks and honours are as at the completion of their tenure:

Commander-in-Chief, Mukti Bahini (1971–1972)

Chief of staff, Mukti Bahini (1971–1972)

Chiefs of Army staff (1972–present)

See also

Chief of Air Staff (Bangladesh)
Chief of Naval Staff (Bangladesh)
List of serving generals of the Bangladesh Army

References

External links

 
Bangladesh